Pauline Marcelle (born 21 July 1964 in Dominica, West Indies) is a contemporary Caribbean artist. She works in a variety of media including painting, sculpture, video and is also a lyricist and songwriter.

Life
Marcelle studied art at the University for Applied Arts in Vienna, Austria in the 1990s and is primarily known for her works in painting and video. Her works reflects much on the thematic subject of human meetings and encounters, their variety, interaction and influential effects of the social surrounding, to which they are subjected. Pauline Marcelle is primarily known for her strong expressive paintings, in which she connects the intensity of modern art with the expressivity and figuration of her Caribbean origin. She lives and works in Dominica and Vienna, Austria.

Works
Bend Down Boutique (2008–2016), painting series
Floating Picnic (2007), raft installation Dumbo Art Center
The Eatings (2004), three piece video installation
What's That Got to Do with Me? (2003), photography-video installation
Double Six (2001) multimedia video installation
Paradogs (2000), multimedia video installation

References

External links
Textile Museum of Canada
Anderswo und Hier
Pauline Marcelle Bend Down Boutique:Non Spaces Metroverlag
 Der Dinge Wiederbelebung
Bei Mir-Ein Bar Pionier
Dominican artist sails at the Pan Am games
Official Website Pauline Marcelle
...really???
Dominican Artist Exhibits Exquisite Works of Art
Dominican Artist at International Art Show

1964 births
Living people
Dominica artists